The Hunter 54 is an American sailboat that was designed by Warren Luhrs, John Cherubini and Cortland Steck as a cruiser and first built in 1980. The design was based upon three years of off-shore racing experience.

Production
The design was built by Hunter Marine in the United States between 1980 and 1983, but it is now out of production.

Design
The Hunter 54 is a recreational keelboat, built predominantly of fiberglass, with wood trim. The hull was designed by Warren Luhrs and John Cherubini, while Cortland Steck designed the rig. It has a cutter rig, a raked stem, a walk-through reverse transom with a swimming platform, folding ladder and dinghy stowage in a watertight compartment, an internally mounted spade-type rudder controlled by a wheel and a fixed fin keel. It displaces  and carries  of ballast.

Factory standard equipment included a cockpit-mounted, six-man, life-raft; 120% staysail; anchor and built-in anchor roller; integral solar panel; teak and holly cabin sole; two fully enclosed heads with showers; private forward and aft cabins; a dinette table; refrigerator; dual sinks; gimbaled stove and oven;  fiberglass dinghy, with oars and life jackets.

The design has a PHRF racing average handicap of 54 with a high of 42 and low of 66.

See also
List of sailing boat types

References

External links
Official brochure

Keelboats
1980s sailboat type designs
Sailing yachts
Sailboat type designs by Warren Luhrs
Sailboat type designs by John Cherubini
Sailboat type designs by Cortland Steck
Sailboat types built by Hunter Marine